The 8th or The Eighth may refer to:

The 8th (Doc Walker album), 2014
The 8th (Paul Heaton album), 2012
The 8th (film), 2020 Irish film
The Eighth (album), by Cecil Taylor, 1981
The Eighth (United States), a former U.S. holiday

See also

8 (disambiguation)